The Short Biography of Li He is the earliest surviving record of the life of the Chinese poet Li He ( – ). It was compiled by the poet Li Shangyin. Du Mu's preface to the collected poems of Li He, which predates the Short Biography, was compiled in 831, but it contains almost no biographical details on Li. Other, later, biographies are given in chapter 137 of the Old Book of Tang and chapter 203 of the New Book of Tang.

Contents 
The work opens with an allusion to Du Mu's preface, and contrasts the "curiosity" of Li's poetry as discussed by Du Mu with the actual account of the man Li which the Short Biography purports to give. The opening passages also make a claim to being based on an account of Li given by his elder sister. The work's physical description of Li ("skinny, unibrow, long fingernails") resembles that given to Taoist immortals in hagiographies such as the Liexian Zhuan.

The Short Biography goes on to discuss Li's poetic composition and his friendships with the renowned poet Han Yu, Wang Shenyuan (王參元/王参元), Yang Jingzhi (楊敬之/杨敬之), Quan Qu (權璩/权璩) and Cui Zhi.

Analysis 
Japanese scholar Hidenobu Wada speculates this was included not only to lend the work an air of credibility as coming from someone who knew the subject intimately, but also to tell the reader that the work would be an account of the "private" as opposed to "public" life of the poet. He attributes it to this reason, for example, that the Short Biography completely neglects the notorious incident in which Li was prevented from pursuing a public service career because of a naming taboo, which saw Li famously defended by Han Yu.

Wada further speculates that Wang Shenyuan, who was the younger brother of Li Shangyin's father-in-law Wang Maoyuan (王茂元), was the husband of Li He's sister.

References

Works cited 
 
 
 
 

Chinese biographies
Tang dynasty literature